Paired amphipathic helix protein Sin3b is a protein that in humans is encoded by the SIN3B gene.

Interactions 

SIN3B has been shown to interact with HDAC1, Zinc finger and BTB domain-containing protein 16, SUDS3 and IKZF1.

See also 
 Transcription coregulator

References

Further reading

External links 
 

Gene expression
Transcription coregulators